The Fate of the Furious (alternatively known as F8 and titled on-screen as Fast & Furious 8 internationally) is a 2017 American action film directed by F. Gary Gray and written by Chris Morgan. It is the sequel  to Furious 7 (2015) and the eighth installment in the Fast & Furious franchise. The film stars Vin Diesel as Dominic Toretto, alongside Dwayne Johnson, Jason Statham, Michelle Rodriguez, Tyrese Gibson, Chris "Ludacris" Bridges, Scott Eastwood, Nathalie Emmanuel, Elsa Pataky, Kurt Russell, Charlize Theron and Kristofer Hivju. In the film, Dom has settled down with his wife Letty Ortiz, until cyberterrorist Cipher (Theron) coerces him into working for her and turns him against his team, forcing them to find Dom and take down Cipher.

The eighth installment was planned since 2014, and plot details were first announced in March 2015 when Diesel appeared on Jimmy Kimmel Live! and announced that the film would be set in New York City. Preparations for the film began immediately before the release of Furious 7, with Diesel, Morgan, and producer Neal H. Moritz re-signing. After setting an initial release date in that same month, casting took place between April and June. In October, Gray was announced to direct the film in the place of James Wan, who had directed the previous installment. Composer Brian Tyler, who had scored the third, fourth, fifth, and seventh installments, returned to compose the eighth.

Principal photography began in March 2016 in locations such as Mývatn, Havana, Atlanta, Cleveland, and New York City, continuing the franchise's tradition of filming around the world. With an estimated production budget of up to $270 million, it is one of the most expensive films ever made. This is the first film in the series since Tokyo Drift not to star Paul Walker as Brian O'Conner, following his death in November 2013.

The Fate of the Furious premiered in Berlin on April 4, 2017, and was theatrically released in conventional and IMAX theatres in the United States on April 14, by Universal Pictures. It received mixed to positive reviews from critics. It got praised for the performances of the cast and action sequences but criticised the storyline. The film was a box office success, grossing over $1.2 billion worldwide, making it the nineteenth film (and the second in the franchise, after Furious 7) to gross over $1 billion, the third-highest-grossing film of 2017, and the eleventh highest-grossing film of all time at the time. It also grossed $541.9 million worldwide during its opening weekend, which made it the highest-grossing worldwide opening of all time until the release of Avengers: Infinity War (2018). The sequel, F9, was released in June 2021.

Plot 

Dominic "Dom" Toretto and Letty Ortiz are on their honeymoon in Havana when Dom's cousin Fernando gets in trouble owing money to local racer Raldo. Sensing Raldo is a loan shark, Dom challenges Raldo to a race, pitting Fernando's 1949 Chevrolet Fleetline against Raldo's 1956 Ford Fairlane Crown Victoria, and wagering his own 1961 Chevrolet Impala. 

After narrowly winning the race, Dom allows Raldo to keep his car, saying his respect is enough and leaves his cousin with his own car. The next day, an elusive woman named Cipher coerces Dom into working for her by showing him something on her phone. Shortly afterward, Diplomatic Security Service (DSS) agent Luke Hobbs recruits Dom and his team, comprising Letty, Roman Pearce, Tej Parker, and Ramsey, to help him retrieve an EMP device from a military outpost in Berlin. During the getaway, Dom forces Hobbs off the road and steals the device for Cipher, who is a cyberterrorist.

Hobbs gets arrested and locked up in the same high-security prison which holds Deckard Shaw. After Hobbs and Shaw both escape the prison, intelligence operative Mr. Nobody and his protégé Eric Reisner recruit them to help the team find Dom and capture Cipher. Deckard reveals that Cipher had hired his brother Owen Shaw to steal the Nightshade device and Mose Jakande to steal God's Eye, Ramsey's software program. The team tracks Dom and Cipher to their own location, moments before the two attack the base, injure the team and steal God's Eye. When Dom shows frustration with Cipher, she shows him his ex-lover and DSS agent Elena Neves, and their son, of whose existence Dom was unaware, having kidnapped both to secure his loyalty. 

Cipher sends Dom to retrieve a nuclear football held by the Russian Minister of Defense in New York City. With the help of Raldo, Dom briefly evades Cipher, and persuades Deckard and Owen's mother, Magdalene, to help him. Cipher hacks into the electronics systems of many cars, remotely controlling them via auto drive, causing them to blockade the convoy so that Dom can take the football. The team intercepts Dom in their cars, but Dom escapes and seemingly kills Deckard. Letty catches up to Dom and steals the football, but is nearly killed by Cipher's enforcer, Connor Rhodes, before Dom stops him and forces the football from Letty. In retaliation, Cipher has Rhodes execute Elena in front of Dom, threatening his son next. 

Dom infiltrates a military separatist base in Russia to use the EMP device to disable security and a nuclear submarine, enabling Cipher to hijack it and attempt to use its arsenal to trigger a nuclear war. They are intercepted by the team, who shut down the submarine's nuclear weapons and drive toward the gates that would prevent the sub from leaving to sea, while being pursued by separatists. Deckard, who faked his death with the help of Magdalene, teams up with Owen and infiltrates Cipher's plane to rescue Dom's son. 

Once Deckard reports that the child is safe, Dom turns on Cipher and kills Rhodes, before rejoining his team. Outraged, Cipher fires an infrared homing missile at Dom's Charger, but he breaks away from his team and lures the missile to the trailing submarine. The team forms a vehicular blockade and shields Dom from the ensuing explosion as the submarine is destroyed. Deckard reaches the front of the plane and confronts Cipher, who escapes by parachute. Mr. Nobody and his protégé visit Dom and his team in New York City to report that Cipher is still at large. Hobbs has his record cleared and is offered his DSS job back, but he declines and chooses to spend more time with his daughter. Deckard delivers Dom his son, putting his differences aside with Dom and Hobbs, and is accepted into their family. Dom names his son Brian and celebrates with his friends.

Cast

 Vin Diesel as Dominic Toretto: A former criminal, professional street racer and millionaire who has retired and settled down with his wife, Letty.
 Dwayne Johnson as Luke Hobbs: A former DSS agent who allied with Dom and his team following their outings in Rio de Janeiro and Europe.
 Jason Statham as Deckard Shaw: A rogue British soldier who was imprisoned by Hobbs and the DSS after his defeat in Los Angeles, who serves as an ally to help Dom's team take down Cipher.
 Michelle Rodriguez as Letty Ortiz-Toretto: Dom's wife and a former professional street racer and the stepmother of Brian Marcos.
 Tyrese Gibson as Roman Pearce: A former criminal from Barstow and a member of Dom's team.
 Chris "Ludacris" Bridges as Tej Parker: A mechanic from Miami and a member of Dom's team.
Scott Eastwood as Little Nobody: A law enforcement agent working under Mr. Nobody.
 Nathalie Emmanuel as Ramsey: A British computer hacktivist and a member of Dom's team.
 Elsa Pataky as Elena Neves: The biological mother of Brian Marcos and a former Rio de Janeiro police officer who moved to the United States to become Hobbs' new partner at the DSS.
 Kurt Russell as Mr. Nobody: An intelligence operative and the leader of a covert ops team which previously aided Dom and his team in taking down Deckard in Abu Dhabi.
 Charlize Theron as Cipher: A criminal mastermind and cyberterrorist who coerces Dom into working against his team by holding Elena and their son hostage.
 Kristofer Hivju as Connor Rhodes: Cipher's right-hand man and second-in-command.

Tego Calderón and Don Omar reprise their respective roles as Tego Leo and Rico Santos, former members of Dom's team, from Los Bandoleros (2009), Fast & Furious (2009) and Fast Five (2011). Patrick St. Esprit appears as DS Allen. Luke Evans reprises his role from Fast & Furious 6 (2013) and Furious 7 (2015) as Owen Shaw, Deckard's younger brother and a former Special Air Service (SAS) soldier who formerly opposed Dom's team in Europe, and who helps his brother in rescuing Dom's son. Helen Mirren makes an uncredited cameo appearance as Magdalene Shaw, the mother of Deckard and Owen Shaw. Celestino Cornielle portrays Raldo, a street racer whose respect Dom earns.

Production

Development 

In November 2014, Universal Pictures chairwoman Donna Langley told The Hollywood Reporter that there would be at least three more films in the franchise after Furious 7. In April 2015, Vin Diesel stated that the possible sequel that "Paul Walker used to say that [an eighth film] was guaranteed. And in some ways, when your brother guarantees something, you sometimes feel like you have to make sure it comes to pass."

Diesel further hinted at an eighth film on Jimmy Kimmel Live! when he stated that Kurt Russell's character would span multiple films. He also stated that the next film would take place in New York City. Chris Morgan returned to write his sixth script in the franchise, while Neal H. Moritz returned to produce. Moritz later stated, "[The story] is going to have to be something enticing for all of us. It has to be as good as or better [than Furious 7]".

At the 2015 CinemaCon in Las Vegas, Diesel announced the film for an April 14, 2017 release date. In August, at the 2015 Teen Choice Awards (where Furious 7 received the award for Choice Movie – Action and Walker received the award for Choice Movie Actor – Action), Diesel gave the film the initial title Fast 8. In September, Diesel stated that the script had almost been completed, and expressed interest in Rob Cohen, who directed the first film, to direct the eighth installment. In October, Diesel announced on The Tonight Show Starring Jimmy Fallon that Straight Outta Compton director F. Gary Gray would direct the film.

In July, Moritz said that Walker's character, Brian O'Conner, would not appear in the film, following the use of CGI in the previous film after Walker died in a single-vehicle accident in November 2013, with Moritz stating that his character had "moved on". It had previously been reported that Paul's younger brother, Cody Walker, would either join the cast in a new role, or replace his older brother in the role of O'Conner; however, it was later announced that the character will not return to the franchise. Moritz also said that the film would shift the focus of the franchise from a series of heist films to a spy caper, following a similar change in focus from street racing in Fast Five (2011). In December 2016, the film was retitled The Fate of the Furious.

Casting 
Diesel, Russell, and Michelle Rodriguez were the first to confirm their involvement in the film, and Tyrese Gibson and Chris Bridges both confirmed their return soon after. Diesel was paid $20 million for his involvement. Lucas Black had signed on to reprise his role from The Fast and the Furious: Tokyo Drift (2006) as Sean Boswell for Furious 7 and two more installments in September 2013. In May 2015, Dwayne Johnson confirmed his involvement in the film, additionally hinting at a possible spin-off film involving his character, Luke Hobbs. Jason Statham also confirmed his return that same month. In April 2016, Charlize Theron and Kristofer Hivju were confirmed as additions to the cast, in villainous roles, while Scott Eastwood also joined the film as a law enforcement agent. In May, Nathalie Emmanuel was confirmed to reprise her role as Ramsey in the film. In June, Helen Mirren announced in an interview with Elle that she would appear in the film. During an interview with Chris Mannix in July, Lucas Black confirmed he would not appear in the eighth installment, due to scheduling conflicts with NCIS: New Orleans.

Filming 

In keeping with the franchise's penchant for filming in "exotic" locations, such as Abu Dhabi and Rio de Janeiro, in January 2016 it was announced that Universal was seeking approval from the United States and Cuban governments to shoot part of the film in Cuba. Principal photography began on March 14, in Mývatn, in Iceland, where strong winds sent a plastic iceberg prop flying into a paddock. The prop struck two horses: one was wounded and the other mortally injured; it was later euthanized. In late April, filming began in Cuba's capital city, Havana. In May, filming also took place in Cleveland. Franchise cinematographer Stephen F. Windon returned for the eighth instalment. Filming also took place in Atlanta and New York City.

Music 

Brian Tyler, who scored the third, fourth, fifth, and seventh installments, was tapped to compose the film score for the eighth picture. A soundtrack album by Atlantic Records was released on April 14, 2017, coinciding with the film's US theatrical release. The film's score album was released on April 28, by Back Lot Music.

Release

Theatrical
The Fate of the Furious had its world premiere in Berlin on April 4, 2017. The film was theatrically released in the United States on April 14. The film was released in 1,074 IMAX screens around the world, making it the widest opening in IMAX history.

Home media
The Fate of the Furious was released on Ultra HD Blu-ray, Blu-ray and DVD on July 11, 2017 by Universal Pictures Home Entertainment.

Reception

Box office 
The Fate of the Furious grossed $226 million in the United States and Canada and $1.010 billion in other territories for a worldwide total of $1.236 billion, against a production budget of $250 million. The film was released in 64 territories worldwide, including almost all major markets (minus Japan), starting from April 12, 2017, and was projected to earn anywhere between $375–440 million in its five-day opening weekend. By the end of the weekend, it ended up earning $539.9 million from nearly 23,000 screens, way above initial projections, to score the biggest global opening in cinematic history until it was surpassed by Avengers: Infinity War (2018). It also marked the third time that a film earned over $500 million in a single weekend, after Star Wars: The Force Awakens (2015) ($529 million) and Jurassic World (2015) ($525.5 million). On April 30, 2017, the film crossed the $1 billion mark, becoming the second film in the franchise to do so, after Furious 7. In IMAX, the film made $31.1 million from 1,079 screens to record the biggest IMAX April debut and the fourth-biggest overall at the time.

United States and Canada 
Like several of its predecessors, The Fate of the Furious was released in the United States and Canada in the month of April, and like its immediate predecessor, occupied the lucrative Easter week holiday period slot, where it was expected to open with $100–125 million. It received the widest pre-summer release ever, at an estimated 4,304 venues, besting the 4,242 opening theater count of Batman v Superman: Dawn of Justice (2016) the previous March. The film made $10.4 million from Thursday night previews from 3,310 theaters, the second-highest of the franchise behind Furious 7s $15.8 million. On its opening day it grossed $45.6 million, with Thursday previews making up 22.8% of the amount, slightly better than the 23% for Furious 7. Earning a total of $98.8 million on its opening weekend, the film scored the second-biggest opening in the franchise (the third-biggest adjusted for inflation) and the third-biggest April debut, behind Furious 7 and The Jungle Book (2016). It posted an almost identical weekend multiplier like its immediate predecessor (2.166× vs 2.18×). Scott Mendelson of Forbes magazine compared the opening to how Spectre (2015) opening fell from Skyfall (2012). One notable record the film set was the best opening for a film with an African-American director, with Gray besting his own record set with Straight Outta Compton (2015).

Other territories 
Internationally, The Fate of the Furious secured a release in 69 countries. The film was projected to post an opening between $275–330 million from over 20,000 screens, with some analysts believing it could go as high as $350–400 million. It opened Wednesday, April 12, 2017, in 8 countries, earning $17.9 million (including previews from 12 countries). It opened in 33 more countries on Thursday, April 2, for a total of 41 countries, earning $58.4 million, marking Universal Pictures overseas' highest-grossing Thursday ever, and for a two-day total of $82.2 million. It added 22 more countries on Friday, April 3, earning $112.1 million to score Universal International's highest-grossing Friday of all time, for a three-day total of $194.8 million. In total, through Sunday, the film registered an opening of $441.1 million from 64 markets, setting new records for the biggest April international debut, Universal's biggest, and the biggest of all time overall (ahead of Jurassic World)—It is the first such film to open past $400 million in a single weekend with a bulk of it coming from China. Around $22.6 million came from 681 IMAX screens which is Universal's second-biggest behind only Jurassic World. It topped the international charts for a second consecutive term, adding another $158.1 million after which it was surpassed by Guardians of the Galaxy Vol. 2 (2017), another film starring Diesel and Russell, in its third weekend. In IMAX, the film has grossed north of $58 million.

It set the record for the biggest opening day of 2017 in every territory it has been released at, the biggest opening day of all time in 16 markets, Universal's biggest opening day ever in 22 territories and the biggest opening in the franchise in 38 markets. Moreover, it recorded the biggest paid previews of all time in Malaysia, Singapore, Venezuela, and Vietnam. In terms of opening weekend, the film debuted at No. 1 in all markets where it set the biggest opening weekend of all time in 20 markets; Universal's biggest opening weekend ever in 28 markets; and the biggest opening in the franchise in 40 markets. The top openings were recorded in China ($192 million), Mexico ($17.7 million), the United Kingdom ($17.5 million), Russia ($14.2 million), Germany ($13.6 million), Brazil ($12.8 million), India ($10.7 million), Korea ($10.6 million), Middle East combined ($9.9 million), Taiwan ($9.3 million), France ($9.2 million), Australia ($9.5 million), Argentina ($9 million), Indonesia ($8.5 million), Italy ($6.7 million), Malaysia ($6.3 million), Spain ($6.1 million), Colombia ($4.9 million), Thailand ($4.9 million), Panama ($4.8 million), Pakistan ($2.5 million), and Romania ($1.7 million). Comparing market-to-market performance, Furious 7 had an opening worth $250 million without China and Russia while The Fate of the Furious delivered $228.2 million debut, sans the two aforementioned markets. In Japan, the film debuted with $7.5 million. Although that's a new record for the franchise, the film debuted at number three behind Disney's Beauty and the Beast (2017) and local film Detective Conan: Crimson Love Letter (2017)—their robust second-weekend earnings blocked the former from taking the top spot, making Japan one of the few markets where the film didn't open at No. 1. The biggest-earning markets are China ($392.8 million), followed by Brazil ($41.8 million), the United Kingdom ($37.5 million), Mexico ($36.8 million), and Germany ($32.4 million). In Peru, it has become Universal's highest-grossing film ever.

Critical response 
The Fate of the Furious received mixed-to-positive reviews from critics. The review aggregator website Rotten Tomatoes reported an approval rating of 67% with an average score of 6.13/10, based on 301 reviews. The website's critical consensus reads, "The Fate of the Furious opens a new chapter in the franchise, fueled by the same infectious cast chemistry and over-the-top action fans have come to expect." Metacritic, which uses a weighted average, assigned the film a score of 56 out of 100 based on 45 critics, indicating "mixed or average reviews". Audiences polled by CinemaScore gave the film an average grade of "A" on an A+ to F scale, and those at PostTrak gave the film an 88% overall positive score and a 71% "definite recommend".

Mike Ryan of Uproxx gave the film a positive review, writing: "This isn't my favorite of the series—that's still Furious 7 (it's hard to top those jumps from skyscraper to skyscraper, but this is a worthy entry). These movies know what they are. These movies know they are fun. These are fun movies!" Owen Gleiberman of Variety, in his positive review of the film, wrote: "Most franchises, after eight films, are feeling a twinge of exhaustion, but this one has achieved a level of success—and perpetual kinetic creative energy—that's a testament to its commercial/cultural/demographic resonance." He also wrote, "If this series, over the last 16 years, has taught us anything, it's that just when you think it's about to run out of gas, it gets outfitted with an even more elaborate fuel-injection system."

David Ehrlich of IndieWire gave the film a C− and called it the worst entry of the franchise, saying: "As much a mess of conflicting tones and styles as it is of locations, this setpiece—like the rest of Gray's movie—feels like a heap of random parts that were thrown together in the hopes that fate might somehow weld them into a roadworthy vehicle. But it's not all groundbreaking." J. R. Kinnard of PopMatters magazine gave a lukewarm review, writing: "It's unlikely that devotees will consider The Fate of the Furious one of the stronger entries in the series. Still, the filmmakers and actors are clearly dedicated to making a quality product, avoiding the complacency that often plagues action sequels." Richard Roeper of the Chicago Sun-Times gave the film two stars out of four, saying: "Moments after Dom has gone rogue and apparently wants to kill them, they're making jokes. As they're racing through the streets of New York City or skidding along the ice in Russia, killing bad guys and narrowly avoiding getting killed themselves, they're crackin' wise. Even within this ludicrous universe, it's jarring to hear these supposedly smart folks, who refer to themselves as 'family,' acting like idiots who don't seem to care if they live or die, or if their friends survive."

Professor of international political economy Richard E. Feinberg has commented on the political significance of the film's opening setting of Havana in the context of shifting U.S.–Cuban relations, calling the eighth instalment, "Hollywood's love letter to Havana". He writes, "In the Cuban sequence's dramatic climax, Dom wins his hard-fought one-mile race ("a Cuban mile") against a tough local competitor, by a nose. The loser is gracious: 'You won my car and you earned my respect,' he admits to the FF hero. Dom's response is equally magnanimous: 'Keep your car, your respect is good enough for me.' In this instance, FF8 captures the essence of the relations between the United States and Cuba: it's all about mutual respect."

Accolades

Sequel 

A sequel titled F9, directed by Justin Lin and written by Daniel Casey, was released on June 25, 2021.

References

External links 

 
 
 
The Fate of the Furious at Rotten Tomatoes

2010s chase films
2010s heist films
2010s road movies
2017 action thriller films
American action thriller films
American chase films
American heist films
American road movies
American sequel films
China Film Group Corporation films
Fast & Furious films
Films about automobiles
Films about nuclear war and weapons
Films about terrorism
Films directed by F. Gary Gray
Films produced by Neal H. Moritz
Films scored by Brian Tyler
Films set in the Arctic
Films set in Berlin
Films set in Havana
Films set in Los Angeles
Films set in New York City
Films set in prison
Films set in Russia
Films set on airplanes
Films shot in Atlanta
Films shot in Cleveland
Films shot in Havana
Films shot in Iceland
Films shot in New York City
Films with screenplays by Chris Morgan
IMAX films
One Race Films films
Original Film films
Submarine films
Universal Pictures films
Films set in 2017
2010s English-language films
2010s American films